Musarrat Ali Bittan is an Indian politician and a member of the Sixteenth Legislative Assembly of Uttar Pradesh in India. He represents the Bilsi constituency of Uttar Pradesh and is a member of the Bahujan Samaj Party political party.

Political  career
Musarrat Ali Bittan has been a MLA for one term. He represented the Bilsi constituency and is a member of the Bahujan Samaj Party political party.

He lost his seat in the 2017 Uttar Pradesh Assembly election to Radha Krishan Sharma of the Bharatiya Janata Party.

Posts held

See also
 Bilsi (Assembly constituency)
 Sixteenth Legislative Assembly of Uttar Pradesh
 Uttar Pradesh Legislative Assembly

References 

Bahujan Samaj Party politicians from Uttar Pradesh
Uttar Pradesh MLAs 2012–2017
People from Budaun district
1971 births
Living people